Ray County may refer to:

 Ray County, Iran
 Ray County, Missouri, U.S.

See also
 Rhea County, Tennessee, U.S.